Hemithirididae is a family of brachiopods belonging to the order Rhynchonellida.

Genera:
 Hemithiris d'Orbigny, 1847
 †Patagorhynchia Allan, 1938
 Pemphixina Cooper, 1981

References

Brachiopods